John Folliott or Ffolliott (1696 – 12 January 1765) was an Irish politician.

John Folliott was the son of Francis Folliott of Ballyshannon and his wife Letitia, daughter of Sir James Cuffe. He sat in the Irish House of Commons for Donegal from 1730 to 1760, and for Kinsale from 1761 until his death. By his wife Frances Goodwin he had several children, including the eldest son Francis, who was the grandfather of John Ffolliott.

References

1696 births
1765 deaths
Irish MPs 1727–1760
Irish MPs 1761–1768
Members of the Parliament of Ireland (pre-1801) for County Donegal constituencies
Members of the Parliament of Ireland (pre-1801) for County Cork constituencies